Priit Tender (born 1971 in Tallinn) is an Estonian animator and animated film director.

His animation films have won numerous prizes from international animation film festivals. Since 2019, he has been the head of the animation department of the Estonian Academy of Arts.

Selected filmography
 1895 (with Priit Pärn and Janno Põldma; 1995) 
 Gravitation (1996)
 The Crow and the Mice (1998)
 Viola (1999)
 Mont Blanc (2001)
 Frank and Wendy (with Priit Pärn, Kaspar Jancis and Ülo Pikkov; 2003-2005)
 Orpheus (2019)

References

External links

1971 births
Living people
Estonian animators
Estonian animated film directors
Academic staff of the Estonian Academy of Arts
Tallinn University alumni
People from Tallinn